Mishkhas Rural District is a rural district (dehestan) in the Sivan District of Ilam County, Ilam Province, Iran. At the 2006 census, its population was 5,166, in 1,037 families.  The rural district has 14 villages.

References 

Rural Districts of Ilam Province
Ilam County